John Maxwell Reed (February 15, 1902 - June 27, 1973) was an American football center who played 35 games, for the Buffalo Bisons, Frankford Yellow Jackets, and New York Giants. He scored one touchdown in his career. He was the Washington Redskins Line Coach in 1950.

References

1902 births
1973 deaths
American football centers
Players of American football from Pennsylvania
Buffalo Bisons (NFL) players
Frankford Yellow Jackets players
New York Giants players